= Lisa Marie Ludwig =

American visual artist and curator (born 1972)

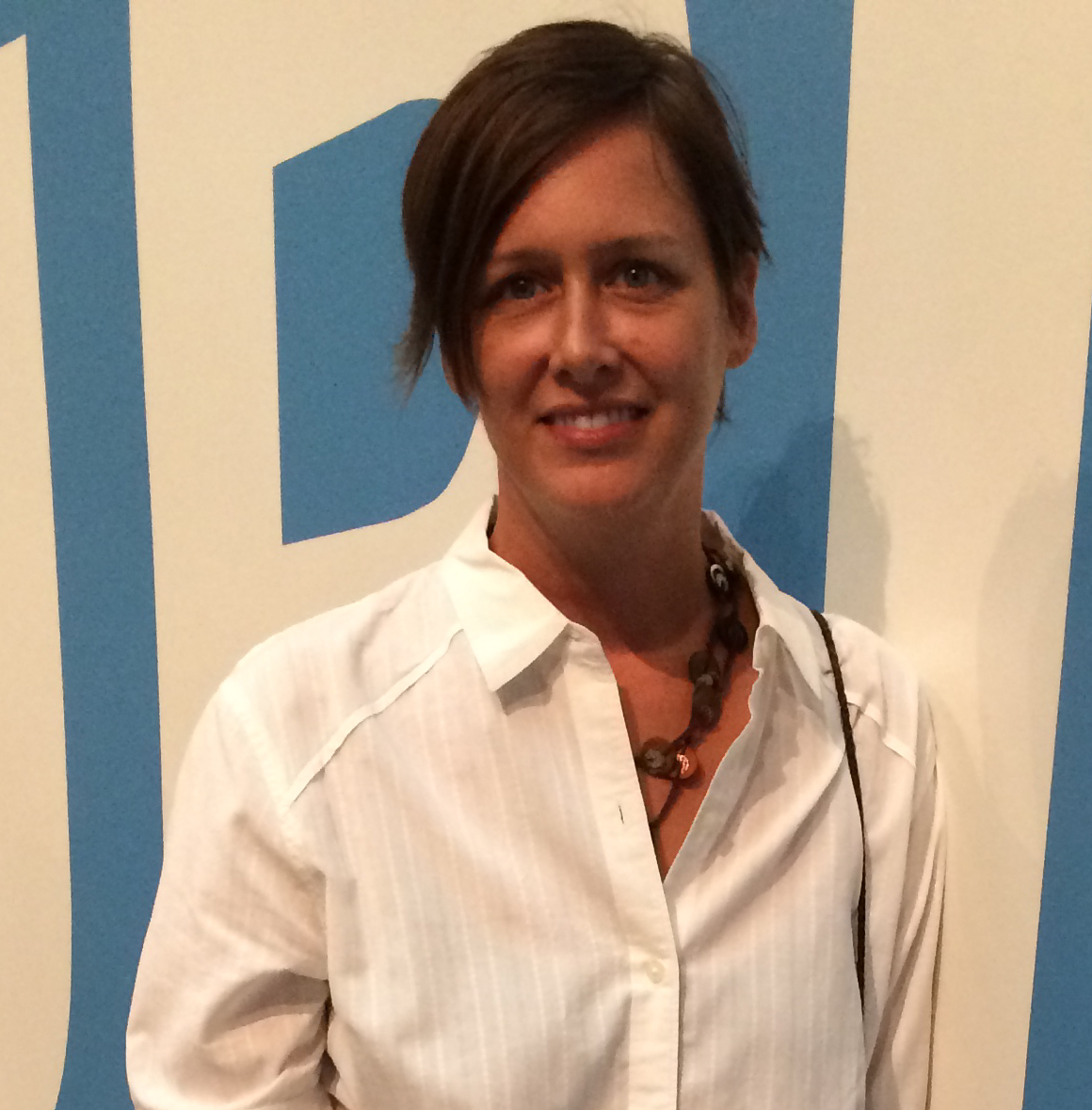
Lisa Marie Ludwig

Lisa Marie Ludwig is an American visual artist and curator. She lives and works in Brooklyn, New York. Her paintings and sculptures are collage-based and her collaborative work involves community participation.

== Work ==
Ludwig's projects are continuing works. In Facade, she creates cardboard relief facades that document buildings in her neighborhood of Williamsburg, Brooklyn. They are an ongoing tribute to the sturdiness yet disappearing architecture and the fluctuation of the environment. The Art Neighborhood is an art installation that has continued to grow and expand over ten years. It consists of diorama-like iterations of shanty towns created using collected detritus materials. Model Blank-Canvas Action Figures are given to participants who embellish them in their own likeness with the intention of donating it to the diorama.

== Art facilitator ==
Ludwig has curated within several venues and is an ongoing progenitor of many art-based community projects. She was a co-founder/curator of Firework gallery between March 2014 and October 2015. The Williamsburg gallery exhibited emerging artists.

== External reference ==
- Official website
